The 2017 Estoril Open (also known as the Millennium Estoril Open for sponsorship purposes) was a professional men's tennis tournament played on outdoor clay courts. It was the third edition of the Estoril Open, and part of the ATP World Tour 250 series of the 2017 ATP World Tour. The event took place at the Clube de Ténis do Estoril in Cascais, Portugal, from 29 April to 7 May 2017.

Singles main draw entrants

Seeds

 Rankings are as of April 24, 2017.

Other entrants
The following players received wildcards into the singles main draw:
  David Ferrer 
  Frederico Ferreira Silva
  Pedro Sousa

The following players received entry using a protected ranking into the singles main draw:
  Tommy Robredo

The following players received entry from the qualifying draw:
  Salvatore Caruso
  João Domingues
  Bjorn Fratangelo
  Elias Ymer

Withdrawals
Before the tournament
  Federico Delbonis →replaced by  Guillermo García López
  Nick Kyrgios →replaced by  Renzo Olivo
  Daniil Medvedev →replaced by  Evgeny Donskoy
  Juan Mónaco →replaced by  Gastão Elias
  Yoshihito Nishioka →replaced by  Kevin Anderson
  Albert Ramos Viñolas →replaced by  Yūichi Sugita

During the tournament
  Juan Martín del Potro

Doubles main draw entrants

Seeds

 Rankings are as of April 24, 2017.

Other entrants
The following pairs received wildcards into the doubles main draw:
  Felipe Cunha-Silva /  Fred Gil 
  Gastão Elias /  Frederico Ferreira Silva

Champions

Singles

  Pablo Carreño Busta def.  Gilles Müller, 6–2, 7–6(7–5)

Doubles

  Ryan Harrison /  Michael Venus def.  David Marrero /  Tommy Robredo, 7–5, 6–2

References

External links
 Official website